Lycée Français François Mitterrand is a French international school in Brasília, Brazil. It serves levels maternelle (preschool) through lycée (senior high school).

See also
 French Brazilian

References

External links
  Lycée Français François Mitterrand
  Lycée Français François Mitterrand

French international schools in Brazil
Schools in Brasília
François Mitterrand